The Fighting Temptations is a 2003 American musical comedy film directed by Jonathan Lynn, written by Elizabeth Hunter and Saladin K. Patterson, and distributed by Paramount Pictures and MTV Films. The main plot revolves around Darrin Hill (Cuba Gooding Jr.) who travels to his hometown of Monte Carlo, Georgia as he attempts to revive a church choir in order to enter a gospel competition with the help of a beautiful lounge singer and childhood friend, Lilly (Beyoncé Knowles), with whom he falls in love. Through the choir's music, Darrin brings the church community back together all the while seeking a relationship with Lilly.

The film is notable for its soundtrack and ensemble cast. The film received mixed reviews upon release.

Plot
In 1980, a young boy named Darrin Hill (Cuba Gooding Jr.) and his mother, MaryAnn (Faith Evans), are run out of town after MaryAnn was soon discovered to be singing secular music when she also sings in a church choir. Aunt Sally (Ann Nesby) attempts to defend MaryAnn, but it fails. The church's cowardly pastor, Reverend Lewis (Wendell Pierce), is too afraid of the other church members to let her stay. MaryAnn and Darrin are last seen saying goodbye to Aunt Sally, as they sadly wave goodbye with each other. In 2003, Darrin has grown up to become a successful advertising executive in New York City with a bad habit of lying. Darrin's only true friend and secretary, Rosa Lopez (Lourdes Benedicto), does a good job at keeping his credit problems under control. However, Darrin has achieved so much under false pretenses and faked his college degree and high school diploma. Darrin also lied about being the son of a congressman, and his lies soon catch up with him and get him in trouble with his paranoid boss (Dakin Matthews) and Darrin loses his job. After being tracked down by a private investigator, Darrin soon finds out that Aunt Sally has died.

Darrin returns to his hometown of Monte Carlo, Georgia and looks back on both comical and heartbreaking memories of MaryAnn and the experiences they had together. When Darrin arrives, he finds a new friendship in Lucious (Mike Epps), the town's happy-go-lucky cab driver. Lucious is obsessed with women's booties and even proclaims himself a "Booty expert" and "Bootyologist". At Aunt Sally's funeral, Shirley Caesar makes a cameo appearance as a character who was an old friend of Sally and sings at the funeral. After the funeral, Darrin soon learns from the Reverend that Aunt Sally had stated in her will that he must direct the church choir and enter the annual "Gospel Explosion" competition and win the prize money of $10,000 and Aunt Sally's stock in the company that produces the show which is currently worth $150,000.

Later, Paulina reveals that Darrin forgot to enter the choir into the auditions. Luckily, the audition judge, Luther Washington (Faizon Love), who is also the town's prison warden, lets them perform in a show for his prisoners when the booked act fails to arrive. Thanks to Lilly's beautiful looks and voice, the choir performs well and Washington lets them into the competition. Washington also lets Darrin use three convicts who can sing well. The three convicts are Bee-Z Briggs, Lightfoot, and Mr. Johnson (T-Bone, Chris Cole, and Montell Jordan). After weeks of success, the choir has become more popular, more people have joined the church and the choir. Darrin also begins dating Lilly. However, Paulina takes a message for Darrin in a phone call from Rosa and learns of his past troubles, and intends on exposing him the first chance she gets. The next afternoon at a church barbecue, Paulina deliberately reveals Darrin's secrets with a polite demeanor, in order to make herself look innocent. Lilly is furious and heartbroken about this and the people who he promised money to begin to panic, and tells Darrin that she doesn't care what he does, she was only using him because he was using her.

Since Lilly wants nothing to do with him, Darrin decides to quit and returns to New York, where he has been offered his job back. However, Darrin goes back and gets a new condo and a promotion, and comes to realize that none of these things mean anything without Lilly and the choir. Darrin quits his job and returns to Monte Carlo to reconcile with Lilly. Darrin and Lilly recruits Lucious and the Reverend and all of them rush down to the Gospel Explosion to join the choir for the performance. When Darrin and Lilly arrive, they manage to convince the others to vote Paulina out of the choir, giving Darrin his position as director back. Before their performance begins, Darrin tells Lilly that she inspired him to name the choir The Fighting Temptations. After an outstanding performance, the choir wins the competition, but before ending his acceptance speech, Darrin surprises Lilly with an unexpected marriage proposal, to which she accepts. Eighteen months later, the two are shown to be happily married with a baby of their own.

Cast

 Cuba Gooding Jr. as Darrin Hill
 Nigel Washington as young Darrin Hill
 Beyoncé Knowles as Lilly
 Chloe Bailey as young Lilly
 Mike Epps as Lucious
 LaTanya Richardson as Paulina Lewis-Pritchett
 Eddie LeVert Sr. as Joseph
 Melba Moore as Bessie Cooley
 Wendell Pierce as Reverend Paul Lewis
 Lou Myers as Homer T.
 Rue McClanahan as Nancy Stringer
 Angie Stone as Alma
 Mitchah Williams as Jimmy B.
 Walter Williams Sr. as Frank
 Rosalie Washington as Faye Jenkins
 Mickey Jones as Scooter
 James E. Gaines as Lilly's Grandfather
 Dave Sheridan as Bill the Mechanic
 Eric Nolan Grant as Samuel
 Zane Copeland Jr. as Derek
 Montell Jordan as Mr. Johnson (Convict #1)
 Darrell Vanterpool as Dean
 T-Bone as Bee-Z Biggs (Convict #2)
 Chris Cole as Lightfoot (Convict #3)
 Mae Middleton as Tasha
 Faith Evans as MaryAnn Hill
 Steve Harvey as Miles Smoke (Local Radio DJ)
 Ann Nesby as Sally Walker
 Dakin Matthews as Mr. Fairchild
 Lourdes Benedicto as Rosa Lopez
 Faizon Love as Luther Washington (Prison Warden)
 Wilbur Fitzgerald as L&G Representative

Cameos
 Reverend Shirley Caesar as herself
 The Blind Boys of Alabama as Themselves
 Mary Mary as Themselves
 Ramiyah as Themselves
 Donnie McClurkin as Judge of Gospel Explosion (Himself)
 Yolanda Adams as Judge of Gospel Explosion (Herself)
 Daphne Duplaix as Tiffany, Darrin's girlfriend

Production
The film crew used several locations throughout Georgia. The final scene was filmed in Columbus, GA at the RiverCenter for the Performing Arts. Several of the extras were local residents of Columbus, GA.

Reception
The music of the film received critical acclaim, most notably, Beyoncé's cover of "Fever".

However, the film itself received generally mixed reviews upon its release. The film was criticized for its screenplay, rehashed premise and lack of chemistry between actors Gooding and Knowles. The film, nevertheless, opened at #2. Notably, Ebert & Roeper reviewed the film and Roger Ebert gave it thumbs up. It holds a 42% rating on Rotten Tomatoes based on 111 reviews, with an average rating of 5.32/10. The site's critical consensus states, "The music is the only saving grace in this predictable and eager-to-please comedy."

The movie grossed only US$32,445,215 worldwide and thus failed to turn a profit thus canceling any plans for a second installment to go into production (though the primary actors had signed on for one).

Soundtrack
A soundtrack accompanied the film and was released by Music World/ Columbia on Sony Music on September 9, 2003. The soundtrack received generally positive reviews and proved to be more successful than the film itself. Only one song from the album, "Summertime", is not included in the movie. The song "Come Back Home" appears in the film, but was not included on the soundtrack album. It also noted that several other songs performed during the movie including "Church Is in Mourning (Aunt Sally's Funeral Tribute)" by Shirley Caesar, "Won't Ever Change" by Mary Mary, "Waiting" by Ramiyah, and "Soldier" by The Blind Boys of Alabama, were also not included on the soundtrack.Mathew Knowles, Executive Producer.

 "Fighting Temptation" — Beyoncé, Missy Elliott, MC Lyte and Free [3:51]
 "I Know" — Destiny's Child [3:43]
 "Rain Down" — Eddie Levert and Angie Stone [3:27]
 "To Da River" — T-Bone, Lil Zane, and Montell Jordan [4:13]
 "I'm Getting Ready" — Ann Nesby [3:15]
 "The Stone" — Shirley Caesar and Ann Nesby [1:53]
 "Heaven Knows" — Faith Evans [5:43]
 "Fever" — Beyoncé [4:32]
 "Everything I Do" — Beyoncé and Bilal [4:22]
 "Loves Me Like A Rock" — The O'Jays [2:26]
 "Swing Low, Sweet Chariot" — Beyoncé [2:05]
 "He Still Loves Me" — Walter Williams Sr. and Beyoncé [4:22]
 "Time To Come Home" — Beyoncé, Melba Moore, and Angie Stone [3:52]
 "Don't Fight The Feeling" — Solange and Papa Reu [3:07]
 "Summertime" — Beyoncé (feat. P. Diddy) [3:54]

Total Length: 54:45

Certifications

Cancelled sequel
In a 2003 interview with the late Mickey Jones (who had a supporting role in the film), for now defunct HollywoodJesus.com, he stated that he hoped the film performed well because all of the principal actors had signed on for a sequel.

Awards and nominations

References

External links
 
 
 
 
 

2003 films
2000s musical comedy films
2003 romantic comedy films
2000s romantic musical films
African-American musical comedy films
African-American romantic comedy films
African-American films
American romantic musical films
Films directed by Jonathan Lynn
Films set in Georgia (U.S. state)
Films set in New York City
Films shot in Atlanta
Films shot in New York City
Gospel music media
MTV Films films
Paramount Pictures films
Religious comedy films
2000s English-language films
2000s American films